Chirui may refer to several places in Romania:

Băile Chirui, a village in the commune Lueta, Harghita County
Chirui, a tributary of the Miletin in Botoșani County
Chirui (Vârghiș), a tributary of the Vârghiș in Harghita County